Michael Standing may refer to:

Michael Standing (footballer) (born 1981), English footballer
Michael Standing (actor) (born 1939), English actor of the 1960s and early 1970s